Erythrophleum lasianthum, the Maputaland ordeal tree, is a tree with a localized range in the endangered lowland forests of southeastern Africa.

Range
It is found from False Bay to Maputaland in northern KwaZulu-Natal province of South Africa, adjacent southern Mozambique and in eastern Eswatini.

Gallery

References

Flora of Mozambique
Flora of Swaziland
Trees of South Africa
lasianthum